ひ, in hiragana, or ヒ in katakana, is one of the Japanese kana, which each represent one mora. The pronunciation of the  voiceless palatal fricative [ç] is similar to that of the English word hue [çuː] for some speakers.

In the Sakhalin dialect of the Ainu language, ヒ can be written as small ㇶ to represent a final h sound after an i sound (イㇶ ih).  Along with other extended katakana, this was developed to represent sounds in Ainu that are not present in standard Japanese katakana.

Stroke order

Other communicative representations

 Full Braille representation

 Computer encodings

References 

Specific kana